Kentucky Route 913 (KY 913) is a  state highway located in Louisville, Kentucky. The route begins at a junction with KY 155 in Jeffersontown and ends at a junction with US 60 in Middletown.

It is known as Blankenbaker Parkway for its entirety.

Route description

Blankenbaker Parkway originates at a junction with KY 155 in a residential area east of Jeffersontown. It travels northward as a divided two-lane road before becoming a four-lane divided roadway as it curves toward the northeast at a junction with KY 913 Spur. Blankenbaker Parkway then curves back toward the north and passes through an industrial area. After forming a junction with Plantside Drive, Blankenbaker Parkway becomes three lanes in both directions, passing through a commercial area with many businesses, restaurants, and hotels lining the roadway. After passing over I-64, Blankenbaker Parkway narrows to two lanes in both directions and passes by the main campus of Southeast Christian Church, one of the largest churches in the United States.

Major intersections

KY 913C

It is known as Blankenbaker Access Drive for its entirety.

See also
Roads in Louisville, Kentucky

References

0913
0913
Transportation in Jefferson County, Kentucky
Jeffersontown, Kentucky
Middletown, Kentucky